Nandre Burger (born 11 August 1995) is a South African cricketer. He made his first-class debut for Gauteng in the 2015–16 Sunfoil 3-Day Cup on 11 February 2016. He made his List A debut for Gauteng in the 2016–17 CSA Provincial One-Day Challenge on 26 February 2017.

He was the leading wicket-taker in the 2017–18 CSA Provincial One-Day Challenge tournament for Gauteng, with 19 dismissals in seven matches. In July 2018, he was named in the Cricket South Africa Emerging Squad.

In September 2018, he was named in Gauteng's squad for the 2018 Africa T20 Cup. He was the leading wicket-taker in the tournament, with eleven dismissals in six matches. In September 2019, he was named in the squad for the Nelson Mandela Bay Giants team for the 2019 Mzansi Super League tournament.

In January 2021, he was named in South Africa's Twenty20 International (T20I) squad for their series against Pakistan. In April 2021, he was named in Western Province's squad, ahead of the 2021–22 cricket season in South Africa.

References

External links
 

1995 births
Living people
People from Krugersdorp
Sportspeople from Gauteng
South African cricketers
Cape Cobras cricketers
Cape Town Blitz cricketers
Gauteng cricketers
Joburg Super Kings cricketers
Lions cricketers
Nelson Mandela Bay Giants cricketers
South Western Districts cricketers
Western Province cricketers